Bovan may refer to:
 Bovan (Aleksinac), Serbia
 Bovan (Kruševac), Serbia